The Georgia Railroad Freight Depot (1869) is the oldest building in downtown Atlanta. 

It is located on the east side of Central Avenue, bordered by the MARTA and freight railroad lines on its north side. It anchors the north side of Steve Polk Plaza, which contains the old World of Coca-Cola building at its south side and an entrance to Underground Atlanta, via a tunnel under Central Avenue, on its west side.

The depot was completed in 1869. The architects were (Max) Corput and Bass. It was the main freight depot for the Georgia Railroad and Banking Company.

A fire in 1935 destroyed the upper floors and the cupola.

In 1981 the building was renovated to accommodate events. It can accommodate 800 seated guests or 1300 standing.

References

External links

 Detailed tour of the Georgia Railroad Freight Depot (amateur video, 2011)
 Georgia Railroad historical marker

Railway stations in the United States opened in 1869
Railway freight houses
Buildings and structures in Atlanta
Max Corput buildings
Industrial landmarks in Atlanta
1869 establishments in Georgia (U.S. state)